The Mozart Symphony Orchestra, formally the London Mozart Symphony Orchestra, is a symphony orchestra founded by Philip Mackenzie and businessman Patrick Tame. It is unique in that it never promotes its own concerts but is only available for hire by other organisations.

External links
 Mozart Symphony Orchestra

British symphony orchestras
London orchestras